Ákos Hanzély (born 26 April 1969) is a Hungarian modern pentathlete. He competed in the men's individual event at the 1996 Summer Olympics.

References

External links
 

1969 births
Living people
Hungarian male modern pentathletes
Olympic modern pentathletes of Hungary
Modern pentathletes at the 1996 Summer Olympics
Sportspeople from Budapest
20th-century Hungarian people